The Seely Style is a studio album released by American country artist Jeannie Seely. It was released in September 1966 on Monument Records and was produced by Fred Foster. It was Seely's debut studio album and spawned two singles that became major hits. Its lead single, "Don't Touch Me", became her biggest hit and signature song as a music artist.

Background and content
The Seely Style was produced by Fred Foster, whom Seely would collaborate with during her recording time with the Monument label. Sessions were held between February and July 1966 at the Fred Foster Sound Studio. Among the first songs recorded was "Don't Touch Me" and the track, "You Tied Tin Cans to My Heart". The album contained 12 tracks that were composed by several singer-songwriters including Merle Haggard, Bobby Bare, John Lennon and Paul McCartney. The album also contains several cuts written by Hank Cochran, Seely's husband at the time. Among the six tracks Cochran wrote was "Don't Touch Me", the opening song on the album. She also covered Cochran's "I Fall to Pieces", which was first recorded by Patsy Cline in 1961. The album also includes Seely's self-penned "It Just Takes Practice", which was first recorded by Dottie West in 1965.

Release and reception

The Seely Style was released in September 1966 via Monument Records and was distributed in a vinyl record format. Six songs were featured on the first side while six were featured on the second side of the album. In the 2010s, the album was released digitally. By December, the record peaked at number 8 on the Billboard Top Country Albums chart. It was her only album to reach the top 10 on any Billboard chart. Its lead single was "Don't Touch Me". The song became her biggest hit, reaching number 2 on the Billboard Hot Country Singles chart by June 1966. It also became her only song to reach the Billboard Hot 100 and adult contemporary charts, peaking at number 85 and number 29 respectively. The album's second single was its seventh track, "It's Only Love". Also becoming a major hit, it reached number 15 on the Billboard country singles chart.

Upon the release of The Seely Style, it was reviewed by Billboard who responded positively. "'The Seely Style' is one of tenderness and warmth as she offers first-rate readings of such greats as 'I Fall to Pieces' and 'Put It Off Until Tomorrow'. Fred Foster has developed a long-time top star," commented the publication.

Track listing

Original edition

Digital release

Personnel
All credits are adapted from the liner notes of The Seely Style.

Musical personnel
 Floyd Cramer – piano
 Bobby Emmons – keyboards
 Buddy Harman – drums
 Charlie McCoy – harmonica
 Boots Randolph – saxophone
 Jerry Reed – guitar
 Jeannie Seely – lead vocals
 Buck Trent – banjo

Technical personnel
 Fred Foster – record producer
 Ed Hamilton – liner notes
 Ken Kim – photography

Chart performance

Release history

References

1966 albums
Jeannie Seely albums
Albums produced by Fred Foster
Monument Records albums